The 1898 Navy Midshipmen football team represented the United States Naval Academy during the 1898 college football season. In their second season under head coach Bill Armstrong, the Midshipmen compiled a 7–1 record, shut out three opponents, and outscored all opponents by a combined score of 130 to 56. The Army–Navy Game was canceled due to Presidential cabinet order.

Schedule

References

Navy
Navy Midshipmen football seasons
Navy Midshipmen football